Beisu is a town in Zoucheng, Jining, in southwestern Shandong province, China. , it has two residential communities and 50 villages under its administration.

References

Township-level divisions of Shandong
Zoucheng